Suzanne Rayappan (born 18 May 1981) is a professional badminton player and a member of the English badminton team. She specializes in mixed doubles.

External links
BWF Player Profile
Badminton England Profile

1981 births
Living people
Sportspeople from Hitchin
English female badminton players
Tamil sportspeople